The Asian American Literary Review (AALR) is a biannual literary magazine and according to its official website is "a space for writers who consider the designation 'Asian American' a fruitful starting point for artistic vision and community." It was founded by Lawrence-Minh Bὺi Davis, Gerald Maa and Larry Shinagawa, and Davis and Maa currently serve as the editors-in-chief. The magazine publishes fiction, poetry, creative nonfiction, translations, comic art, interviews and book reviews, and is sponsored by Binghamton University in Binghamton, New York. It was also founded in 2010.

References

External links
Asian American Literary Review
Hyphen Magazine: Literary Magazine Review of Asian American Literary Review

Asian-American magazines
Biannual magazines published in the United States
English-language magazines
Fiction magazines
Literary magazines published in the United States
Magazines established in 2010
Magazines published in Maryland